Five Corners is a 1987 American independent crime drama film, directed by Tony Bill, written by John Patrick Shanley, and stars Jodie Foster, Tim Robbins, John Turturro, and Rodney Harvey. The film depicts 48 hours in the lives of a group of four young New Yorkers in the 1960s.

Five Corners was released in limited theatres in the United States on January 22, 1988. The film received generally positive reviews from critics but was a financial disappointment, grossing $969,205 in its limited run against a budget of $5.5 million. At the 4th Independent Spirit Awards; Foster won for Best Female Lead, while Turturro was nominated for Best Supporting Male.

It has been misconstrued as a public domain film and pirated by many distributors who copied it from DVDs. However, as per The Copyright Office, copyright is registered under Paragon Entertainment Corporation.

Plot
In the Bronx in 1964 a high-school teacher is shot in the back with an arrow and killed.

A man offers to give two young ladies (who are apparently high) to two teenage boys, even offering them cash to take the women off his hands. These ladies later wake in a strange apartment, lying naked under sheets. The next day, the boys tell the girls that their teacher was murdered, and that is why they were available to take the girls for the car ride.

Heinz has just been released from prison after serving a term for attempted rape, and has returned to his old neighborhood to resume his relationship with his demented mother and to "rekindle" his own demented version of a relationship with Linda, the near-rape victim.  Harry had protected Linda in the near-rape, but since then he has adopted a policy of non-violent response to violence (caused by the murder of his policeman father and the non-violent protests against racism espoused by Dr. Martin Luther King). Harry has now become a Buddhist and a pacifist, and seeks to join Dr. King's movement, making protecting Linda again a difficult task. Heinz calls Linda, and tells her to meet him in a park at midnight. She reluctantly agrees, knowing that he may become dangerous if she doesn't comply. When arriving at the pool, she finds a board to use for protection and hides it. Heinz shows her a present he got for her: two penguins he stole from the Bronx zoo. She tells him that he has to return them because penguins need special food. Heinz becomes outraged, thinking that she was rejecting his gift, and kills one of the penguins. Linda fights Heinz off, and runs off with one of the penguins.

Heinz takes an unconscious Linda to a rooftop, where police secure the building. A sharpshooter is in a position to kill him but doesn't because it would endanger Linda. Heinz is killed by a mysterious arrow to his back.

Cast

 Jodie Foster as Linda
 Tim Robbins as Harry
 Todd Graff as Jamie
 John Turturro as Heinz
 Michael R. Howard as Murray
 Pierre Epstein as George
 Jery Hewitt as Mr. Glasgow
 Rodney Harvey as Castro
 Daniel Jenkins as Willie
 Elizabeth Berridge as Melanie
 Carl Capotorto as Sal
 Campbell Scott as Policeman

References

External links
 
 
 
 

1987 films
1980s crime drama films
American crime drama films
HandMade Films films
Films set in New York City
Films set in 1964
Films scored by James Newton Howard
Films set in the Bronx
Golan-Globus films
Films with screenplays by John Patrick Shanley
1987 drama films
1987 independent films
Films directed by Tony Bill
1980s English-language films
1980s American films